Tillandsia rhomboidea is a species of flowering plant in the family Bromeliaceae, native to Bolivia, Colombia, Costa Rica, Ecuador, Honduras, southeastern Mexico and Venezuela. It was first described by André in 1888.

References

rhomboidea
Flora of Bolivia
Flora of Colombia
Flora of Costa Rica
Flora of Ecuador
Flora of Honduras
Flora of Southeastern Mexico
Flora of Venezuela
Epiphytes
Plants described in 1888
Taxa named by Édouard André